Franco Foda (born 23 April 1966) is a German football coach and former player who was most recently the manager of Swiss club FC Zürich.

Club career
Foda appeared in over 400 top-flight matches in (West) Germany, Switzerland and Austria. 

Foda joinedFC Basel's first team during the winter break of their 1996–97 season under head coach Karl Engel. Foda played his domestic league debut for his new club in the home game in the St. Jakob Stadium on 2 March 1997 as Basel won 1–0 against Zürich. During his few months with the club, Foda played a total of 15 games for Basel, without scoring a goal. 13 of these games were in the Nationalliga A, one was in the Swiss Cup and the other one was a friendly game.

International career
During his second spell with 1. FC Kaiserslautern in the 1980s he won two caps with the West Germany national team under coach Franz Beckenbauer; Foda played against Argentina and Brazil in late 1987. During his first ever international appearance, on 12 December 1987 in Brasilia against Brazil, Foda was at the centre of controversy. Both at the reading of the team names and later when he was substituted in, he was met with great applause by the Brazilian fans. Foda only found out the next day that this was due to his name translating to "free intercourse" in Portuguese.

Coaching career

Early career

Foda moved into coaching with Sturm Graz as an assistant coach. He had been interim head coach between 20 September 2002 until November 2002. At this point, Foda became the permanent head coach until they hired Gilbert Gress to become the head coach on 4 June 2003. He then went on to coach the reserve team immediately after to when he was promoted to head coach of the first team on 1 June 2006. Sturm Graz won the 2010–11 Bundesliga and the 2009–10 Austrian Cup under Foda. He was originally scheduled to leave after the 2011–12 season. However, he ended up being sacked on 12 April 2012 after the club was knocked–out of the Austrian Cup.

1. FC Kaiserslautern
On 22 May 2012, Foda was announced as new head coach of 1. FC Kaiserslautern, who had just been relegated to the second division after two seasons in the top flight. On 29 August 2013, he was sacked as head coach with immediate effect.

Return to Sturm Graz
Foda returned to Sturm Graz on 30 September 2014 and won his first match in–charge on 4 October 2014 against Grödig.

Austria national team
In October 2017 it was announced that Foda would become manager of the Austria national team, with effect from January 2018. Foda resigned from the position in March 2022, following their failure to qualify for the 2022 FIFA World Cup after the defeat to Wales in Cardiff.

FC Zürich
On 8 June 2022, he was announced as the new head coach of Swiss champions FC Zürich, replacing André Breitenreiter. Foda was sacked by Zürich on 21 September.

Personal life
Foda is of Italian descent through his father. His son Sandro (born 1989) first appeared professionally with Sturm Graz in 2007, when his father was head coach.

Coaching record

Honours

Player
1. FC Kaiserslautern
DFB-Pokal 1989–90

Bayer Leverkusen
DFB-Pokal: 1992–93

Sturm Graz
Austrian Football Bundesliga: 1997–98, 1998–99
Austrian Cup: 1998–99
Austrian Supercup: 1999

Manager
Sturm Graz
Austrian Cup: 2009–10
Austrian Football Bundesliga: 2010–11

References

External links
 
 
 

1966 births
Living people
German footballers
German football managers
Germany international footballers
Germany under-21 international footballers
German sportspeople of Italian descent
Bundesliga players
2. Bundesliga players
1. FC Kaiserslautern II players
1. FC Kaiserslautern players
Arminia Bielefeld players
1. FC Saarbrücken players
Bayer 04 Leverkusen players
VfB Stuttgart players
FC Basel players
Austrian Football Bundesliga players
SK Sturm Graz players
German expatriate footballers
Expatriate football managers in Austria
SK Sturm Graz managers
Association football defenders
2. Bundesliga managers
Austria national football team managers
UEFA Euro 2020 managers
German expatriate football managers
German expatriate sportspeople in Austria
Sportspeople from Mainz
FC Zürich managers
Swiss Super League managers
Expatriate football managers in Switzerland
German expatriate sportspeople in Switzerland
West German footballers